Cleveland Township is the name of two townships in the U.S. state of Indiana:

 Cleveland Township, Elkhart County, Indiana
 Cleveland Township, Whitley County, Indiana

See also
Cleveland Township (disambiguation)

Indiana township disambiguation pages